"Turn So Cold" is a single by American rock band Drowning Pool, from their self-titled album. It is the third song from the album. Fans who preordered the album received "Turn So Cold", as well as the first single from the album, "Feel Like I Do" starting April 13, 2010.

"Turn So Cold" is one of the highest-charting singles by Drowning Pool, reaching #8 at the Hot Mainstream Rock Tracks chart and #25 at the Rock Songs chart.

Music video
The official music video was released in June.

Track listing

Personnel
 Ryan McCombs - vocals
 C. J. Pierce - guitar
 Mike Luce - drums
 Stevie Benton - bass

Chart positions

2010 singles
Drowning Pool songs
2010 songs
Songs written by Stevie Benton
Songs written by Ryan McCombs
Eleven Seven Label Group singles